Commodore Alireza Tangsiri is an Iranian military officer and the current commander of Navy of the Islamic Revolutionary Guard Corps appointed since 23 August 2018, replacing Ali Fadavi.

U.S. sanctions 
On 24 June 2019, the U.S. Treasury Department sanctioned him, freezing any of his U.S. assets and banning U.S. persons from doing business with him.

References 

Living people
1962 births
Iranian commodores
Iranian individuals subject to the U.S. Department of the Treasury sanctions